"Amigo" is a 1980 reggae song by UK band Black Slate. It reached No.9 in the UK  and New Zealand charts. Its success emphasized Black Slate's prominence as one of the few UK-grown reggae bands. It was followed with international tours that included Europe and New Zealand.

Track listings 
7"

 "Amigo" – 4:05
 "Black Slate Rock" – 3:14

7" (Vertigo, Canada)

 "Amigo" – 3:33
 "Live Up to Love" – 4:15

12"

 "Amigo" – 6:44
 "Black Slate Rock" – 4:38

Charts

References 

1980 songs